Con Poder may refer to:

 Con Poder (Salvador album), 2003
 Con Poder (Vico C album), 1996